The Garda Technical Bureau is the longest established specialist unit in the Garda Síochána, the police force of the Republic of Ireland. The Bureau comprises eight Sections each providing a specialist service to the Garda Síochána:

Administration
Ballistics
Fingerprinting
Fogra Tora (Garda information booklet) 
Forensic Document Examination
Forensic Liaison Office
Mapping
Photography

External links
Official Garda Síochána site - About The Technical Bureau

Technical Bureau